François de Lamothe (1928–2011) was a French art director. He designed the film sets on a number of productions between the 1950s and the 2000s, including Jean-Pierre Melville's Le Samouraï. He was nominated four times for the César Award for Best Production Design.

Selected filmography
 Pierrot la tendresse (1960)
 Cartouche (1962)
 How to Succeed in Love (1962)
 Hotel Paradiso (1966)
 Piaf (1974)
 One, Two, Two : 122, rue de Provence (1978)
 Les Misérables (1982)
 He Died with His Eyes Open (1985)

References

Bibliography
 Powrie, Phil. The Cinema of France. Wallflower Press, 2006.
 Sherry, Norman. The Life of Graham Greene: 1955-1991. Penguin Books, 2005.

External links

1928 births
2011 deaths
French art directors
People from Meaux

fr:François de Lamothe